The 2016 Huntingdonshire District Council election took place on 5 May 2016 to elect members of Huntingdonshire District Council in England. This was on the same day as other local elections.

Results Summary

Ward results

Brampton

Godmanchester

Huntingdon East

Huntingdon North

Little Paxton

Ramsey

Sawtry

Somersham

St Ives East

St Ives South

St Ives West

St Neots Eaton Ford

St Neots Eaton Socon

St Neots Eynesbury

The Hemingfords

Warboys and Bury

Yaxley and Farcet

By-elections between 2016 and 2018

St Neots Eaton Ford by-election
A by-election was held in St Neots Eaton Ford on 4 May 2017 after the resignation of Conservative councillor David Harty. The seat was gained for the St. Neots Independent Group by Charles Bober.

References

2016 English local elections
2016
2010s in Cambridgeshire